The 1969 Akron Zips football team represented Akron University in the 1969 NCAA College Division football season as an independent. Led by ninth-year head coach Gordon K. Larson, the Zips played their home games at the Rubber Bowl in Akron, Ohio. They finished the season with a record of 9–1, ranked third in the AP NCAA College Division poll, and outscored their opponents 316–103.

Schedule

References

Akron
Akron Zips football seasons
Akron Zips football